Enrique Jose Lavernia (born 1960) is a Cuban-American material scientist and engineer. He is currently Distinguished Professor of Materials Science and Engineering at the University of California, Irvine's Henry Samueli School of Engineering. From 2015 to 2021, he served as UC Irvine's provost and executive vice chancellor. Lavernia previously taught at the University of California, Davis, where he served as Dean of the College of Engineering and as the university's interim provost and executive vice chancellor.

Education 
Lavernia's family left Cuba in 1965. After attending high school in Puerto Rico, Lavernia matriculated at Brown University. He earned a Bachelor of Science with honors in solid mechanics at Brown in 1982. Lavernia completed a Master of Science and doctoral degree from the Massachusetts Institute of Technology in 1984 and 1986, respectively.

Career 
Lavernia joined UC Irvine in 1987 as an assistant professor. He eventually became chair of the Department of Chemical Engineering & Materials Science and a Chancellor's Professor before moving to UC Davis in 2002. Lavernia served as Dean of the UC Davis College of Engineering between 2002–2009 and 2011–2015. From January 2009 to January 2011, he served as the university's interim provost and executive vice chancellor. Lavernia returned to UC Irvine in 2015 as provost and executive vice chancellor. He stepped down in March 2020 and was ultimately succeeded in the role by Hal Stern.

Honors and awards 

 Foreign Member, Chinese Academy of Engineering, 2020
 2020 Acta Materialia Gold Medal
 Fellow, National Academy of Inventors, 2016
 Fellow, National Academy of Engineering, 2013

References 

1960s births
21st-century American engineers
Cuban emigrants to the United States
Brown University alumni
Massachusetts Institute of Technology alumni
University of California, Irvine faculty
University of California, Davis faculty
American materials scientists
Fellows of the National Academy of Inventors
Living people